Come Again Smith is a lost 1919 American silent comedy-drama film distributed by Pathé Exchange and directed by E. Mason Hopper. It is based on a play Come Again Smith by John H. Blackwood.

Cast
 J. Warren Kerrigan as Joe Smith
 Henry A. Barrows as Ned Stevens (credited as H. A. Barrows)
 William Conklin as Franklin Overton
 Winifred Greenwood as Anne Stevens
 Lois Wilson as Lucy Stevens
 Charles K. French as Joe Smith Sr. (credited as Charles French)
 Walter Perry as John Creighton

References

External links
 
 
 A still from the film (University of Washington / Sayre collection)

1919 films
American silent feature films
Lost American films
Films directed by E. Mason Hopper
American films based on plays
American black-and-white films
1910s English-language films
1919 comedy-drama films
Pathé Exchange films
Films distributed by W. W. Hodkinson Corporation
1919 lost films
Lost comedy-drama films
1910s American films
Silent American comedy-drama films